Camrelizumab (SHR-1210) (INN) is an anti-PD-1 immune checkpoint inhibitor that is being investigated for hepatocellular carcinoma and Hodgkin lymphoma.

References 

Monoclonal antibodies